The Government of Nepal is the federal executive authority of Nepal. Prior to the abolition of the Nepali monarchy in 2006 (Nepal became a republic in 2008), it was officially known as His Majesty's Government.

The head of state is the president and the prime minister holds the position of the head of executive. The role of president is largely ceremonial as the functioning of the government is managed entirely by the prime minister, who is appointed by the Parliament. The heads of constitutional bodies are appointed by the president on the recommendation of Constitutional Council, with the exception of the attorney general, who is appointed by the president on the recommendation of the prime minister.

History

Old Bharadari governmentship
The character of  government in Kingdom of Nepal was driven from consultative state organ of the previous Gorkha hill principality, known as Bharadar. These Bharadars were drawn from high caste and politically influential families. For instance; Thar Ghar aristocratic group in previous Gorkha hill principality. Bharadars formed consultative body in the kingdom for the most important functions of the state as Councellors, Ministers and Diplomats. There was no single successful coalition government as court politics were driven from large factional rivalries, consecutive conspiracies and ostracization of opponent Bharadar families through assassination rather than legal expulsion. Another reason was the minority of the reigning King between 1777 and 1847 that led to establishment of anarchial rule. The government was stated to have controlled by regents, Mukhtiyars and alliance of political faction with strong fundamental support. In the end of the 18th century, the central politics was regularly dominated by two notable political factions; Thapas and Pandes. As per historians and contemporary writer Francis Hamilton, the government of Nepal comprised

1 Chautariya
4 Kajis
4 Sirdar/Sardars
2 Subedars
1 Khazanchi
1 Kapardar.

As for Regmi states, the government of Nepal comprised
4 Chautariyas
4 Kajis
4 Sirdar/Sardars. Later, the number varied after King Rana Bahadur Shah abdicated his throne to minor son in 1799. There were 95 Bharadars as per the copper inscription of King Rana Bahadur Shah.

In 1794, King Rana Bahadur Shah came of age and his first act was to re-constitute the government such that his uncle, Prince Bahadur Shah of Nepal, had no official part to play. Rana Bahadur appointed Kirtiman Singh Basnyat as Chief (Mul) Kaji among the newly appointed four Kajis though Damodar Pande was the most influential Kaji. Kirtiman had succeeded Abhiman Singh Basnyat as Chief Kaji while Prince Bahadur Shah was succeeded as Chief (Mul) Chautariya by Prince Ranodyot Shah, then heir apparent of King Rana Bahadur Shah by a Chhetri Queen Subarna Prabha Devi. Kajis had held the administrative and executive powers of nation after the fall of Chief Chautariya Prince Bahadur Shah in 1794. Later, Kirtiman Singh was secretly assassinated on 28 September 1801, by the supporters of Raj Rajeshwari Devi and his brother Bakhtawar Singh Basnyat, was then given the post of Chief (Mul) Kaji. Later Damodar Pande was appointed by Queen Rajrajeshwari as Chief Kaji. When the exiled abdicated King Rana Bahadur Shah prepared his return in 1804, he arrested many government officials including then Chief Kaji Damodar Pande and sacked the reigning government. He took over the administration of Nepal by assuming the position of Mukhtiyar (chief authority). A new government was constituted with favoring officials. Bhimsen Thapa was made a second kaji; Ranajit Pande, who was the father-in-law of Bhimsen's brother, was made the Mul (Chief) Kaji; Sher Bahadur Shah, Rana Bahadur's half-brother, was made the Mul (Chief) Chautariya; while Rangnath Paudel was made the Raj Guru (royal spiritual preceptor). Later in April 1806, tensions arose between Chief Chautariya Sher Bahadur Shah and Mukhtiyar Rana Bahadur Shah on the night of 25 April 1806 during a meeting at Tribhuvan Khawas's house where around 10 pm, Sher Bahadur in desperation drew a sword and killed Rana Bahadur Shah before being cut down by nearby courtiers, Bam Shah and Bal Narsingh Kunwar, also allies of Bhimsen. The assassination of Rana Bahadur Shah triggered a great massacre in Bhandarkhal (a royal garden east of Kathmandu Durbar) and at the bank of Bishnumati river after which Kaji Bhimsen killed 55 senior officials to benefit from the chaos. He was declared Mukhtiyar (Chief Authority) of Nepal and led the new government from a royal mandate of minor King Girvan Yuddha Bikram Shah.

Mukhtiyars ruled over the executive and administrative functions of the state until its replacement by British conventional prime minister in 1843 conferred upon then ruling Mukhtiyar Mathabar Singh Thapa.

Ideals of the old Bharadari governmentship
The policies of the old Bharadari governments were derived from ancient Hindu texts as Dharmashastra and Manusmriti. The King was considered as an incarnation of Lord Vishnu and was the chief authority over legislative, judiciary and executive functions. The judiciary functions were decided on the principles of Hindu Dharma codes of conduct. The king had full rights to expel any person who offended the country and also pardon the offenders and grant return to the country. The government on practicality was not an absolute monarchy due to the dominance of Nepalese political clans making the Shah monarch a puppet ruler. These basic Hindu templates provide the evidence that Nepal was administered as a Hindu state.

Structure

Head of State 
President : Ram Chandra Paudel
Vice President : Ram Sahaya Yadav

Executive 
Prime Minister : Pushpa Kamal Dahal
Chief Secretary : Shankar Das Bairagi

Legislative 
 Speaker of House of Representatives : Dev Raj Ghimire
 Chairman of National Assembly : Ganesh Prasad Timilsina

Judiciary 
Chief Justice of the Supreme Court : Cholendra Shumsher JBR

Government agencies in Nepal

Ministries
Current cabinet : Third Dahal cabinetDate of formation : 26 December 2022

Constitutional bodies

Security services

International organisation participation 
United Nations, UNDP Nepal, SAARC, ESCAP, FAO, ICAO, IDA, IFAD, IFC, IMF, IMO, Interpol, UNCTAD, UNESCO, WHO, WTO.

See also 
 Local self-government in Nepal
 List of mayors of places in Nepal

Notes

References

External links
 Official website

 
Asian governments